The 2010 United States Senate special election in New York took place on November 2, 2010, concurrently with other elections to the United States Senate in other states as well as elections to the United States House of Representatives and various state and local elections. Governor David Paterson had appointed Kirsten Gillibrand to serve as United States Senator from New York until the 2010 special election, replacing former Senator Hillary Clinton, who resigned to serve as Secretary of State in the Barack Obama administration. The winner of the special election was to complete the term ending in January 2013. The special election took place concurrently with the regular election for the Senate seat held by Charles Schumer and the 2010 New York gubernatorial election.

Due to this special election, 2010 marked the first time since the ratification of the 17th Amendment in 1913 that all of New York's six statewide offices were up for popular election on the same day. These elections coincided with the elections of all United States representatives from New York, all members of the New York State legislature, and many other officeholders.

Appointment history

Background 
Hillary Clinton's temporary status as the front-runner for the Democratic nomination for president in 2008 generated intense speculation about who would be appointed to serve out the rest of her term if she won the presidency.  As envisioned then, Eliot Spitzer would have been making the appointment, and David Paterson, then Lieutenant Governor of New York, was considered the "friendly, safe and politically expedient choice" to be appointed senator. But a variety of other choices were also considered plausible.

Once Barack Obama won the Democratic nomination, speculation about Clinton's successor largely evaporated and then resumed when President-elect Obama selected Clinton to serve as Secretary of State.  Clinton announced that she would not resign her Senate seat until confirmed. Paterson, who succeeded Gov. Spitzer following his resignation, said he would not announce a selection until Clinton formally resigned resulting in intense political maneuvering and speculation about his eventual choice.

Potential candidates 
During the appointment process, a large number of candidates were mentioned, including:

 Buffalo Mayor Byron Brown
 Former President Bill Clinton
 New York State Attorney General and eventual Governor of New York Andrew Cuomo
 New York State Assemblywoman RoAnn Destito
 Actress Fran Drescher
 Then-U.S. Representative and eventual seat-winner Kirsten Gillibrand
 U.S. Representative Brian Higgins
 U.S. Representative Steve Israel
 Attorney, author, and eventual U.S. Ambassador to Japan Caroline Kennedy
 U.S. Representative Nita Lowey
 Former Lieutenant Governor Stan Lundine
 U.S. Representative Carolyn Maloney
 U.S. Representative Greg Meeks
 U.S. Representative Jerrold Nadler
 New York State Assemblyman Daniel J. O'Donnell
 Nassau County Executive Thomas Suozzi
 U.S. Representative Nydia Velázquez
 United Federation of Teachers President Randi Weingarten

Speculation 
An early favorite for selection was New York Congresswoman Nita Lowey, who in the late 1990s had been planning a run for the 2000 Senate election, but had stepped aside once then-First Lady of the United States Clinton had decided to run for the office. But Lowey soon withdrew from consideration, having gained enough seniority to become one of the powerful "cardinals" on the House Appropriations Committee and did not want to relinquish that position. Another who withdrew from consideration was New York Congresswoman Nydia Velázquez.

Senator Schumer did not publicly indicate a preference, but reportedly favored Congresswoman Gillibrand.

The indication by Caroline Kennedy that she was possibly interested in being appointed drew the most media attention.  Her family legacy (including that her uncle Robert F. Kennedy had previously held the seat) and star power was balanced against her inexperience in politics and elections.  Her uncle Senator Ted Kennedy, in a battle with brain cancer, encouraged her to seek the position.  On December 15, Kennedy indicated that she was definitely seeking the appointment, making phone calls to Paterson and other prominent Democrats.  Kennedy and her uncle had backed Obama over Clinton at a crucial time in the long presidential nomination struggle, and some past Clinton supporters initially disparaged Kennedy's qualifications for the senate seat.  But soon Clinton told her supporters not to stand in the way of a Kennedy selection; Clinton said she herself would have no public comments on any of the possible choices.

Public opinion polls showed that Kennedy and Cuomo were the two most popular choices of New York residents, with their large name recognition factors playing a role. Paterson faced a complex set of factors in making the choice.  Women's groups were pressuring him to replace Clinton with another woman, while upstate groups were dissatisfied at their lack of representation in top-level statewide offices.  Paterson's own gubernatorial election campaign could benefit from a Democratic star such as Kennedy in the senate race, which would help him raise money and increase voter enthusiasm, while the choice of Kennedy would also bolster his relations with the Obama administration.  Whatever candidate is chosen would be faced with likely having to raise $35 million for the 2010 special election and then, if victorious, another $35 million for the 2012 regular election two years later.

By later in December, Kennedy had mounted a concerted effort to gain support around the state, and had made several trips and appearances as well.  Kennedy's appointment was supported by Congresswoman Louise Slaughter, State Assemblyman Vito Lopez, New York City mayor Michael Bloomberg, former New York City Mayor Ed Koch and the New York Post editorial page.  She received criticism for not voting in a number of Democratic primaries and general elections since registering in 1988 in New York City and also for not providing details about her political views. 

Kennedy declined to make disclosures of her financial dealings or other personal matters, stating that she would not release the information publicly unless she was selected by Paterson, at which time she would be subject to the same background checks as all appointees. Kennedy acknowledged that she was going to have to prove herself: "Going into politics is something people have asked me about forever. When this opportunity came along, which was sort of unexpected, I thought, `Well, maybe now. How about now?' [I'll have to] work twice as hard as anybody else ... I am an unconventional choice ... We're starting to see there are many ways into public life and public service."

The apparent effort by Kennedy forces to make her appear the "inevitable" choice drew reports of resistance among Democratic officials, including Paterson himself.  Kennedy said she will not run for the seat in 2010 if she is not appointed by Paterson.  In late December 2008, Kennedy drew criticism from several media outlets for lacking clarity in interviews, and for using the phrase "you know" 168 times during a 30-minute interview with NY1.  At one point, there was speculation among Democratic Party officials that Paterson would make a caretaker appointment, meaning someone who would pledge to only serve the two years and not run in 2010.  This would allow Paterson to avoid choosing among competing choices and give them a level playing field two years hence.  Speculation even focused on former President Bill Clinton as the caretaker, but on New Year's Day Paterson seemed to indicate he was not inclined towards the idea: "In the United States Senate, the most effective senators are the ones that have seniority."

By early January 2009, Kennedy's support had dropped in public opinion polls, with 44 percent of New Yorkers saying they had a lesser impression of her since she began her campaign for the appointment, versus 23 percent having a better impression.  A mid-January Quinnipiac University Polling Institute poll showed Cuomo 7 percentage points ahead of Kennedy in voter preference, and more voters than not thinking Kennedy was unqualified for the position.  Paterson made all interested candidates submit lengthy vetting documents as part of their candidacy.  An official of the League of Women Voters criticized Paterson for not making the vetting questions public.  Paterson said he would announce his decision shortly after the Obama inauguration.

On January 22, 2009, after several conflicting reports, Kennedy released a statement withdrawing from consideration for the seat, citing personal reasons.  The following day, further conflicting reports ensued over what the specific reason was for Kennedy's withdrawal, and whether or not Paterson would have picked her had she stayed in.  Some of the reports were based on Paterson's office planting false stories with the press that Kennedy had serious problems with the hiring of a nanny or unpaid taxes.

Polling

Appointment 
On the same day that Kennedy dropped out, WPIX-TV and the Albany Times Union reported that Governor Paterson was expected to announce he was appointing Kirsten Gillibrand. The Governor made the official announcement of Gillibrand's appointment at a press conference in Albany on January 23, 2009.

By a month later, Paterson had conceded that his office had been responsible for leaks at the end of the appointment process, intended to contest the Kennedy camp's claim that she had been his first choice for the position.  Paterson said, however, that he had not expected the level of attacks that ensued from his office at the time: "The things said about Caroline I found despicable and shocking and very painful. I never would have imagined removing the idea that this is my first choice meant a character assassination."

Democratic primary 
The Democratic primary election was held on September 14, 2010.

Background 
Paterson's appointment of Gillibrand alienated Caroline Kennedy and Andrew Cuomo supporters as well as some key liberal Democratic ideological constituencies, and made it possible that the centrist Gillibrand would face a primary challenge in 2010.  She did not have the full backing of the New York congressional delegation either, and one state Democratic operative said, "I think she's going to get a serious primary in 2010."

Carolyn McCarthy, formerly a colleague of Gillibrand's in the New York delegation to the United States House of Representatives, said that if Gillibrand was appointed, she would mount a primary campaign against her in 2010 if no other candidate who favored stricter gun control laws did so.  McCarthy is known as a staunch advocate of gun control laws, after her husband was murdered in a 1993 commuter train shooting spree, while Gillibrand was endorsed by the National Rifle Association.  Gillibrand also served as a lawyer for Philip Morris, Inc.

Despite the potential for a primary challenge, Democratic Senatorial Campaign Committee chairman Bob Menendez, Senator from New Jersey, suggested that by the election, Gillibrand "will have convinced her fellow Democrats that she deserves their support."  However, a February 2009 Quinnipiac University Polling Institute poll showed Gillibrand losing a hypothetical primary matchup to McCarthy, and Gillibrand was said to be worried that Governor Paterson's declining popularity would pull her down too.  Congresswoman Carolyn Maloney and Manhattan Borough President Scott Stringer were also seriously considering a primary challenge to Gillibrand, as was Long Island Congressman Steve Israel.  In April 2009, Stringer formed an exploratory committee towards that end.  Despite the possible challenges, by April 2009 Gillibrand had raised $2.3 million in campaign funds since joining the Senate.

In May 2009, Obama persuaded Israel to forsake a run, in the interests of not having a messy primary.  Obama's intervention was largely at the request of Gillibrand patron Charles Schumer.  However, Congresswoman Maloney indicated that she was still considering a primary challenge and that Israel's decision would not influence hers.  Several days later, Stringer said he would not run either, for the same reasons as Israel.  In the wake of their withdrawals, Congressman José Serrano considered running for a while.

In early June 2009, Congresswoman McCarthy took herself out of any run.  McCarthy, who had raised only a small fraction of the amount of money Gillibrand had, said her declining was for personal reasons.  Maloney, however, still seemed likely to run, and a conversation with Vice President Joe Biden did not change her mind.  Several House Democrats from New York said that the White House's interventions to forestall a primary race had been unwise.

As July 2009 began, a senior advisor to Maloney indicated that the congresswoman definitely was in, saying "She's decided to run because she believes there needs to be a debate on the real issues and she wants to give New Yorkers a choice." However, after facing difficulties in hiring staff, and losing some longtime supporters and organizational support in preparation for a bid, Maloney backed out in August 2009.

In September 2009, a New York Post report that former Governor Eliot Spitzer was considering a Senate run were labeled "totally untrue" and "ridiculous" by Spitzer and his allies.

During 2009, Suffolk County legislature Majority Leader Jon Cooper seriously considered running against Gillibrand, but at the end of the year he opted out of running and endorsed Gillibrand instead.

Labor activist and 2006 Senate challenger Jonathan Tasini announced his candidacy as a Democratic opponent to Gillibrand in late 2009. Thereafter, however, he withdrew from the race, choosing instead to mount a primary challenge to Congressman Charles Rangel.

In January 2010, The New York Times reported that former congressman Harold Ford Jr. of Tennessee was considering a primary challenge against Senator Kirsten Gillibrand. Ford moved to New York City after his unsuccessful senate run in Tennessee and was working as a vice-president of Merrill Lynch. He was reportedly backed by several high-profile Democrats, prominent Democratic donors and Wall Street executives who were dissatisfied with Senator Gillibrand. The New York Times originally reported that New York City Mayor Michael Bloomberg might support Ford in a primary challenge. They later reported however, that Senate Majority Leader Harry Reid called Mayor Bloomberg to discuss the possibility of Bloomberg backing Ford but they reported that he assured the Majority Leader "that he was not personally involved in the effort to promote a Ford candidacy." Senator Schumer reportedly met with Ford to try and dissuade him from challenging Gillibrand but said the meeting had been planned months in advance. Ford had already drawn fire from liberal advocacy groups and Gillibrand supporters who criticized Ford as being too conservative for the state, citing his anti-abortion stance, support for gun rights, and his previous opposition to same-sex marriage and pro-business stance. Ford sought to portray himself as an independent voice for New Yorkers saying that he wouldn't be "intimidated or bullied" by "Albany and Washington." Gillibrand's allies sought to portray Ford as opportunistic and out-of-step with New York Democratic voters, citing his conservative record as a Representative of a southern state in Congress. Gillibrand's camp denied intimidation efforts against Ford, saying that Gillibrands supporters "aren't bullying, they're informing New Yorkers." .

The tussle was enough to bring renewed attempts to lure Congressman Steve Israel into reconsidering a race to represent liberal interests, but his spokesperson said, "The congressman appreciates the encouragement he's received to reconsider his decision regarding the U.S. Senate race in New York. That said, it's hard to imagine a scenario in which he'd re-enter the race."  On March 1, Ford indicated that he would not in fact run. On July 14, 2010 New York City attorney Gail Goode delivered 45,000 petitions to the state Board of Elections in order to qualify for a slot on the Democratic line in the September 14 primary against Gillibrand.

Candidates 
On Ballot

 Kirsten Gillibrand, incumbent U.S. Senator
 Gail Goode, attorney

Not on the ballot on September 14
 Joseph Huff, running on the Rent Is Too Damn High Party line

Not running
 Former Representative Harold Ford, Jr., Chairman of the Democratic Leadership Council. Ford had represented Tennessee's 9th congressional district from 1997 to 2007 and moved to New York in 2007.
 Labor activist Jonathan Tasini, originally announced he was running, then backed out to run for Charles Rangel's congressional seat.
 Oral Surgeon Scott Noren claimed to be running, but never submitted a petition. He later announced his intention to run for the same seat in 2012.

Polling

Results 

.9

Republican primary 
The Republican primary election was held on September 14, 2010.

Background 
Congressman Peter T. King made his likely candidacy clear in December 2008, partly to mention that he was not challenging former New York City mayor Rudy Giuliani as the latter was not in the running and partly to counter the wave of publicity for Caroline Kennedy. By January 2009, King was still deliberating over whether he would run, with the main factor being whether he could raise the estimated millions he would need.  National Republican Senatorial Committee Chair John Cornyn was said to support King, which could keep other Republican contenders out of play.  However, Cornyn reportedly met with former Governor George Pataki to discuss his potential candidacy, which other Republicans were advocating.  In June 2009, due to an appointment to the House Intelligence Committee, King said he was much less likely to run.  As August 2009 closed, King announced officially that he would not run, saying: "Senator Gillibrand generates neither strong support nor opposition. This makes it virtually impossible for me to raise the campaign funds I would need to overcome the built-in Democratic registration advantage and the countless millions of dollars which the Democrats will make available to Senator Gillibrand."  In September 2009, Giuliani reiterated that he had no interest at all in running for the Senate seat,  though, much like Andrew Cuomo's anticipated desire to run for governor, it did not stop speculation that Giuliani might change his mind, and by October 2009, speculation continued that Giuliani would run for the Senate seat, particularly if Cuomo ran for governor.<ref name="ji1030">Illuzzi, Joseph (October 30, 2009). "A Few Things." PoliticsNY.net.'.' Retrieved October 30, 2009.</ref> On November 19, 2009, the New York Daily News reported Giuliani would not run for Governor, and in fact would run for the Senate for fill out the last two years of the Clinton term, then use that as a springboard for another presidential run.  However, a Giuliani spokesperson quickly dismissed the notion that any such plan was in place, saying "When Mayor Giuliani makes a decision about serving in public office, he will inform New Yorkers on his own." On November 26, 2009, Mayor of Larchmont Liz Feld said she's considering running for the seat.

In January 2010, Congressman Peter T. King said he was reconsidering running for the seat.  Real estate magnate and publisher Mort Zuckerman was seriously considering a bid by February 2010.  Nominally a Democrat, Zuckerman was more likely to run as a Republican or independent in order to avoid an expensive primary fight.  But in early March, he indicated he would not run, saying he had not the time to do it.   In April 2010, despite a Quinnipiac University Polling Institute result placing him five points ahead of Gillibrand in a potential matchup, Pataki removed himself from consideration.  The former governor instead said he would instead run an organization dedicating itself to repealing the Affordable Care Act.

Bruce Blakeman, a former Nassau County legislator and losing candidate in the New York Comptroller election, 1998, was the first to enter the race, doing so in February 2010. On March 16, 2010, Former U.S. Representative Joe DioGuardi announced his entrance into the race, followed shortly by economist David Malpass. Blakeman and Malpass gained the requisite 25% of delegate votes at the state Republican convention in June 2010, with Blakeman gaining the majority of delegate votes to be the designated nominee; DioGuardi did not, despite leading in primary polls and having the Conservative Party endorsement. DioGuardi filed over 25,000 petitions to get onto the primary ballot and was eligible to compete against Blakeman and Malpass in the Republican primary.

Each candidate had an additional ballot line to run on regardless of whether they won the Republican primary; DioGuardi was backed by the Conservative Party of New York State, Malpass by Carl Paladino's Taxpayers Party of New York, and Blakeman by the Nassau County-based Tax Revolt Party. Malpass cleared the Taxpayers line after the primary loss and ceded it to DioGuardi, but Blakeman remained on the general election ballot as the TRP candidate.

 Candidates 
On Ballot
 Bruce Blakeman, Port Authority Commissioner and 1998 comptroller candidate
 Joe DioGuardi, former U.S. Congressman
 David Malpass, American economic analystBenjamin, Elizabeth (March 16, 2010). Malpass in the Mix . The Daily Politics (New York Daily News). Retrieved March 16, 2010.

Not running
 Former Governor George Pataki"Gillibrand draws opponents from both parties" Newsday January 26, 2009.
 Former Mayor of New York City Rudy Giuliani confirmed that he was not going to seek the Senate seat in 2010, and would look for better opportunities in the private sector instead, according to aides to Giuliani. He also ruled out a run in a January 2010 interview with Larry King.
 Former Congresswoman Susan Molinari
 Congressman Peter T. King
 Liz Feld, Mayor of Larchmont
 Brian Kolb, Assembly Minority Leader. Kolb also turned down a chance to run against Eric Massa for the 29th congressional district.
 Mort Zuckerman, owner of the New York Daily News.
 Diana Taylor, former state banking superintendent and girlfriend of New York City mayor Michael Bloomberg
 Dan Senor, former adviser to President Bush, Fox News and The Wall Street Journal contributor, and husband of Campbell Brown.
 Ed Diana, Orange County executive
 C. Scott Vanderhoef, Rockland County executive, 2006 lieutenant governor candidate

 Polling 

 Results 

 General election 

 Candidates 

 Major 
 Democratic: Kirsten Gillibrand
 Republican: Joe DioGuardi

 Minor 
 Anti-Prohibition Party: Vivia Morgan
 Conservative Party: Joe DioGuardi
 Green Party: Cecile Lawrence
 Independence Party: Kirsten Gillibrand
 Libertarian Party: John Clifton
 Rent Is Too Damn High Party: Joseph Huff
 Taxpayers Party: Joe DioGuardi (originally David Malpass)
 Tax Revolt Party: Bruce Blakeman
 Working Families Party: Kirsten Gillibrand

 Campaign 
Gillibrand claimed to be an independent thinker and takes a back seat to no one. She also released television advertising touting her experience as from upstate New York. DioGuardi criticized Gillibrand's recent photos in Vogue magazine.Sen. Gillibrand’s hot new D.C. look – TODAY Fashion & Beauty – TODAYshow.com

 Debates 
 October 16 on WABC-TV
 October 21 in Russell Sage College in Troy on NY1

 Predictions 

 Polling 

 Fundraising 

 Results 

Further reading
 Paterson, David (2020). Black, Blind, & in Charge: A Story of Visionary Leadership and Overcoming Adversity. New York: Skyhorse Publishing

 References 

 External links 
 New York State Board of Elections
 Official candidate list
 U.S. Congress candidates for New York at Project Vote Smart
 New York U.S. Senate 2010 from OurCampaigns.com
 Campaign contributions from Open Secrets
 Election 2010: New York Special Senate from Rasmussen Reports
 2010 New York Senate Race from Real Clear Politics
 2010 New York Senate Race from CQ Politics
 2010 New York Senate (B) General Election: All Head-to-Head Matchups graph of multiple polls from Pollster.com''

New York 2010
New York 2010
2010 Special
New York Special
United States Senate Special
United States Senate 2010
Kirsten Gillibrand